Howard Clement Okey (12 February 1906 – 3 March 1985) was an Australian rules footballer who played for Essendon in the VFL.

Okey was a pacy centreman, winning Essendon's Best and Fairest award in 1929. He also represented Victoria at interstate football three times during his career.

References

External links

1906 births
Australian rules footballers from Melbourne
Essendon Football Club players
Crichton Medal winners
1985 deaths
People from Kensington, Victoria